Viviane Porto Silva (born 2 January 1981) is a Brazilian actress and former dancer.

Biography 
Porto began acting as an adolescent. She has participated in numerous theatrical productions, ranging from amateur to professional. She was a member of the Pia Fraus Company, combining dance with interpretation.

She is a noted activist for the rights of women and black people. Porto spent several years studying in Europe, where she co-founded the first local documentary festival NodoDocFest.

Her first appearance on TV was as one of the dancers of the game show Fantasia, from 1997 to 1999. In 2015, she acted as the hairdresser Cilene in Babilônia, a telenovela. In 2016, she participated in the series 3%, Netflix's first original Brazilian production, as Aline.

Filmography

Television

Cinema

References

External links 
 

1980 births
Living people
Actresses from São Paulo
Afro-Brazilian actresses
Brazilian television actresses
Brazilian film actresses
Brazilian telenovela actresses
Brazilian stage actresses